Nudie  Jeans is a denim brand founded in 2001 
by Maria Erixon. Nudie  Jeans is based in Gothenburg, Sweden. Its parent company is Svenska Jeans Holding.

Origin
Erixon has stated that she is drawn to designing jeans because "the more you wear and repair jeans, the more character they have. Denim is a living fabric that changes over time – and they are for everyone, of all ages and genders".

Finances
As of 2003, the company had 12 employees, revenue of 93 million Swedish kronor ($ million US dollars) and a net income of 13.6 million kronor ($ million US dollars). 70% of  revenue was generated outside of Sweden.  In 2004, Nudie's net income increased by 70%.

In 2019, Nudie Jeans increased its net revenue to 489.4 million SEK ($ million US dollars). As of 2021, the total number of global employees rose  to 199 people.

See also
Jeans
Western fashion
2010s in fashion

References

External links
 

Clothing companies established in 2001
Clothing companies of Sweden
Clothing brands of Sweden
Companies based in Gothenburg
Jeans by brand